The sixth Hoveyda government was a cabinet of Iran led by Prime Minister Amir-Abbas Hoveyda that was formed on 27 May 1974 and presented to Shah Mohammad Reza Pahlavi in 29 May. Hoveyda reshuffled in the cabinet on November 8, 1976, replacing all of his ministers. The government was dissolved in August 1977 and replaced by that of new Prime Minister Jamshid Amouzegar.

Background 
On 27 May 1974, Hoveyda appointed Hushang Ansary as Minister of Finance, replacing Jamshid Amouzegar. Amouzegar was then made Minister of the Interior.

The same day, Hoveyda established the Ministry of Industry and Mines, Ministry of Commerce and Ministry of Social Welfare. He also reorganized the existing Ministry of Finance and Economic Affairs, Ministry of Energy and Ministry of Information and Tourism.

Other appointments included Karim Motamedi as Minister of Post and Telecommunications, Gholamreza Kianpour as Minister of Information, Fereydoun Mahdavi as Minister of Commerce, Abdol Hossein-Samii as Minister of Science and Higher Education, Reza Azimi as Minister of War, Iraj Vahidi as Minister of Energy, Farrokh Najmabadi as Minister of Industry and Mines and incumbent Abbas Ali Khalatbari as Minister of Foreign Affairs.

Cabinet 
Cabinet members were as follows:

References 

1974 establishments in Iran
1977 disestablishments in Iran
Cabinets established in 1974
Cabinets disestablished in 1977
Cabinets of Iran